Compsodrillia is a genus of sea snails, marine gastropod mollusks in the family Pseudomelatomidae, the turrids and allies.

Species
Species within the genus Compsodrillia include:
 Compsodrillia acestra (Dall, 1889)
 Compsodrillia albonodosa (Carpenter, 1857)
 Compsodrillia alcestis (Dall, 1919)
 Compsodrillia bicarinata (Shasky, 1961)
 Compsodrillia canna (Dall, 1889)
 † Compsodrillia catherina W.P. Woodring, 1928 
 Compsodrillia disticha Bartsch, 1934
 † Compsodrillia drewi (Gardner, 1948)
 Compsodrillia duplicata (Sowerby I, 1834)
 Compsodrillia eucosmia (Dall, 1889)
 Compsodrillia excentrica (Sowerby I, 1834)
 Compsodrillia fanoa (Dall, 1927) 
 † Compsodrillia foruita MacNeil, 1960
 Compsodrillia gonae Jong & Coomans, 1988
 Compsodrillia gracilis McLean & Poorman, 1971
 Compsodrillia gundlachi (Dall & Simpson, 1901)
 Compsodrillia haliostrephis (Dall, 1889)
 Compsodrillia haliplexa (Dall, 1919)
 Compsodrillia jaculum (Pilsbry & Lowe, 1932)
 Compsodrillia mammillata Kuroda, Habe & Oyama, 1971
 Compsodrillia nakamurai J. Makiyama, 1931
 Compsodrillia nana Bartsch, 1934
 Compsodrillia olssoni McLean & Poorman, 1971
 Compsodrillia opaca McLean & Poorman, 1971
 Compsodrillia petersoni Bartsch, 1934
 † Compsodrillia senaria W.P. Woodring, 1928
 Compsodrillia thestia (Dall, 1919)
 † Compsodrillia torvita F.S. MacNeil, 1960 
 † Compsodrillia tricatenaria (T.A. Conrad, 1862) 
 Compsodrillia tristicha (Dall, 1889)
 Compsodrillia undatichorda McLean & Poorman, 1971
 † Compsodrillia urceola W.P. Woodring, 1928
Species brought into synonymy
 † Compsodrillia chowanensis Gardner, 1948: synonym of † Sediliopsis chowanensis (J. Gardner, 1948)
 Compsodrillia halis H.A. Pilsbry & H.N. Lowe, 1932: synonym of Compsodrillia albonodosa (Carpenter, 1857)
 Compsodrillia polytorta (Dall, 1881): synonym of Hindsiclava polytorta (Dall, 1881)

References

External links
  Proceedings of the United States National Museum 70 (1927)  Dall,W.H. (1927), Small shells from dredgings off the southeast coast of the United States by the United States Fisheries steamer Albatross in 1885 and 1886. No. 2667, pp. 1-134.April 20, 1927
 
 Bouchet, P.; Kantor, Y. I.; Sysoev, A.; Puillandre, N. (2011). A new operational classification of the Conoidea (Gastropoda). Journal of Molluscan Studies. 77(3): 273-308
 Worldwide Mollusc Species Data Base: Pseudomelatomidae
 De Jong K.M. & Coomans H.E. (1988) Marine gastropods from Curaçao, Aruba and Bonaire. Leiden: E.J. Brill. 261 pp. 

 
Pseudomelatomidae